Jean Wilks  (1917-2014) was a headmistress at The Hertfordshire and Essex High School and King Edward VI High School for Girls. She studied at North London Collegiate School and Somerville College, Oxford, where she was later made an honorary fellow. During her career, she was a governor and adviser to the Schools' Council, sat on the Public Schools Commission, was president of the Association of Headmistresses and was the first female pro-chancellor of Birmingham University. When she retired in 1977, she was appointed CBE for services to education.

Her brother was Hector Wilks.

References 

2014 deaths
Women school principals and headteachers
1917 births
Alumni of Somerville College, Oxford
Fellows of Somerville College, Oxford
Commanders of the Order of the British Empire